

The Mooi River is a river in KwaZulu-Natal Province, South Africa. It rises in the Mkomazi Nature Reserve in the Drakensberg Mountains, and empties into the Tugela River near Muden. The town of Mooi River lies on the river.

Name
The name derives from the Dutch Mooirivier, i.e. pretty river, as it was named by the Voortrekkers in the mid-19th century. The river's Zulu name, Mpofana, means 'young eland'.

See also
Mooi River (town)
Tugela River

External links
 Department of Water Affairs and Forestry background information to Mooi-Mgeni Transfer Scheme Phase II

Notes

Rivers of KwaZulu-Natal

af:Mooirivier (KwaZulu-Natal)